Büsum-Wesselburen is an Amt ("collective municipality") in the district of Dithmarschen, in Schleswig-Holstein, Germany. Its seat is in Büsum. It was formed on 25 May 2008 from the former Ämter Kirchspielslandgemeinde Büsum, Kirchspielslandgemeinde Wesselburen and the town Wesselburen.

The Amt Büsum-Wesselburen consists of the following municipalities (with population in 2005):

Ämter in Schleswig-Holstein